The Church of Denmark, officially Evangelical Lutheran Church in Denmark or National Church.

Danish Church may also refer to:
Catholic Church in Denmark
Danish Seamen's Church and Church Abroad
Baptist Union of Denmark
Reformed Synod of Denmark